Ola Naguib (Arabic: علا نجيب) is an Egyptian TV producer of Middle East Business Report, a weekly business program on BBC World News. Naguib joined the BBC team in Dubai in 2007. Before that, she worked for the Saudi television network, MBC. She  spent 3 years in publishing both in the UAE and in Egypt. Naguib studied Mass Communications and Journalism at the American University in Cairo.

References

See also 
 Middle East Business Report
 Nima Abu-Wardeh
 BBC World News

Egyptian journalists
Living people
Year of birth missing (living people)